The Castle Museum is located in Nideggen Castle in the county of Düren, in the German state of North Rhine-Westphalia.

History 
In 1898, the county of Düren received Nideggen Castle. Around 1922 the Local History Museum of Düren County and the Town of Nideggen (Heimatmuseum des Kreises Düren und der Stadt Nideggen) was established in the fighting tower or bergfried. In the Second World War the tower was used by artillery units as an observation post. The tower house suffered a direct hit during an air raid on 6 December 1944 and much of it collapsed. After extensive rebuilding, the castle museum was re-opened on 27 September 1979.

Museum 
The museum is housed in eight rooms on several floors within the tower. Here there are models of castles in the Eifel mountain region between the rivers of the Moselle and Rhine and the German border. The exhibits include suits of armour, halberds and swords. Methods of torture and interrogation, medieval justice and incarceration are explained. In one room the economic system of the Middle Ages, for example, feudalism in the Holy Roman Empire, tithing and tithe stones (Zehntsteine), are explained. In the cellar, the dungeon can be seen in which the archbishops of Cologne, Conrad of Hochstaden and Engelbert II of Falkenburg were imprisoned.

On the fifth floor visitors can enjoy long-distance views as far as the Cologne area.

Literature 
 Klaus Ring: Eifeler Burgenmuseum im Bergfried der Burg Nideggen. In: Burgen und Schlösser. Jg. 20, No. 2, 1979, p. 128.
 Franz-Josef Brandenburg: Das 1. Burgenmuseum der Eifel, in Jahrbuch 1998 Kreis Düren, p. 97,

External links 
  

Nideggen
Nideggen
Museums in the Eifel
Military and war museums in Germany
Castle museums